Mark Antony Viduka (born 9 October 1975) is an Australian former soccer player who played as a centre forward. He captained the Australia national team to the Round of 16 at the 2006 FIFA World Cup which remains their best ever performance to date. His four goals in the UEFA Champions League are the most scored by any Australian player.

Club career

Melbourne Knights
In 1993, Viduka started his professional career in Australia for Melbourne Knights (which up until the 1993 season was known as Melbourne Croatia) and became an Australian international in June of the following year. In his two seasons with the Knights, he was top goal scorer in the National Soccer League (NSL) and was twice awarded the Johnny Warren Medal for NSL Best Player of the Year in 1993–94 and 1994–95. His time at Melbourne Knights included one NSL title in the 1994–95 season. The grandstand at Knights' Stadium, home of the Knights, was renamed the "Mark Viduka Stand" in his honour and paid for with his transfer money.

Dinamo Zagreb
In 1995, Viduka moved to Croatia to play with Croatia Zagreb (now Dinamo Zagreb). He spent three-and-a-half seasons with the club, helping it to win three doubles in Croatia between 1996 and 1998. He was also part of the Croatia Zagreb team that reached the third round of the UEFA Cup in 1997 and went on to make his UEFA Champions League group stage debut with the club a year later. He won the Best Foreigner Footballer Award in the Croatian League in his time at Zagreb.

Celtic
Celtic bought Viduka in December 1998 for £3.5 million. In the same month as his signing, Celtic announced that Viduka had quit the club without kicking a ball for them, citing stress as his reason.

A week later, Croatia Zagreb complained that it had not received the agreed fee for the player. These issues were eventually resolved and Viduka made his first appearance in a Celtic shirt on 16 February 1999, scoring for the under-21 team as an over-age player in a 4–2 victory against Motherwell. After making his first team debut against Dundee United on 27 February 1999, his first goals for the club came when he scored a brace against Greenock Morton in the Scottish Cup on 8 March 1999. He was voted Scottish Player of the Year for 1999–2000 after scoring 27 goals in his first full season at Celtic Park. He was regarded as a skilled player, with Josip Šimunić noting his ability to hold the ball up well and bring other players into the game.

In February 2000, lower league team Inverness Caledonian Thistle defeated Celtic in a shock upset in the third round of the Scottish Cup. During half time Viduka reportedly threw his boots in the bin and refused to play in the second half after an altercation with assistant coach, Eric Black. The match ended 3–1 with Celtic fans in uproar.

In March 2000, Viduka assisted Celtic to win Scotland's 1999-2000 Scottish League Cup. He left after his first full season at the club.

Leeds United
Leeds United manager David O'Leary signed Viduka just before the 2000–01 season for £6 million. At Leeds, he was expected to line up in a three-pronged attack alongside the previous season's top scorer Michael Bridges and Australia teammate Harry Kewell, but injuries to those two saw him form a partnership with Alan Smith in Leeds' Champions League matches, while Robbie Keane – signed on loan from Inter Milan as cover for Bridges – also benefited in their Premier League matches together in the second half of the season. In his first season, Viduka scored 22 goals, including all four in a memorable 4–3 win over Liverpool at Elland Road. He signed a five-year deal in the summer of 2001 and would star in both domestic competitions and Europe, with Leeds finishing in the country's top four in 2000–01, and fifth in 2001–02. In the summer of 2001, Viduka was the subject of interest from A.C. Milan, whom he supported as a child, but the move ultimately did not happen, and held talks with Alex Ferguson at Manchester United, but decided against moving across the Pennines to join Leeds' rivals.

In the 2002–03 campaign, Viduka scored another 22 goals, including a hat-trick in a 6–1 win at Charlton Athletic and the winner in a 3–2 victory at Arsenal on the penultimate day of the season that effectively saved United from relegation.

However, the club's financial crisis continued, and resulted in the sale of key players including Harry Kewell and Robbie Keane. In the 2003–04 season, Viduka was again top scorer at Leeds, finishing the season strongly as was the case in the previous season, as interim manager Eddie Gray attempted to steer the club away from the Premier League trap door following the departure of Peter Reid in November after eight months as manager.

However, during his final appearance in the jersey, Leeds were relegated in a 4–1 loss to Bolton Wanderers at Reebok Stadium. After scoring a penalty, Viduka was sent off following two yellow cards. He was sold to Middlesbrough in the summer of 2004 as United's financial difficulties deepened.

Middlesbrough
Following Middlesbrough's League Cup victory in 2004, the club qualified for the 2004–05 UEFA Cup. The squad was bolstered with a number of high-profile signings to cope with the increased fixture list and to ensure it could compete on the European stage. Viduka was signed from Leeds for £4.5 million and unveiled as one of the marquee signings of the summer.

Viduka's debut season at Middlesbrough was initially impressive, albeit frustrated by injuries. However, in his second season, the 2005–06 season, Viduka was in sensational form in all competitions for Middlesbrough, reaching double figures early on in the season, including a stunning volley away at Birmingham. He played an important part in helping the club reach the League Cup quarter final, FA Cup semi final and UEFA cup final. Viduka helped to spearhead a European campaign which saw the club overturn a three-goal deficit in the quarter and semi final second legs of the competition to proceed to the final. Middlesbrough eventually lost in the final to Sevilla on 10 May 2006, a result which Viduka has since said took him four months to get over.

In August 2006, he was awarded the number 9 shirt at Middlesbrough, his preferred number at all his previous clubs. Viduka's third season at Middlesbrough was his most prolific, scoring 19 goals in all competitions. With his contract due to expire at the end of the 2006–07 season, Middlesbrough manager Gareth Southgate expressed his interest in retaining Viduka. Southgate reiterated his wish to retain Viduka's services and revealed he would offer him a new contract. Given his impressive haul for the season, Viduka attracted interest from a number of clubs who were hoping to sign him on a free transfer as he became out-of-contract. Viduka joined north-east rivals Newcastle United on a free transfer on 7 June 2007.

Viduka remains Middlesbrough's top goalscorer at the Riverside, and regularly features in Middlesbrough fan polls for top XI Riverside era players.

Newcastle United

In signing for Newcastle, Viduka became manager Sam Allardyce's first signing at the club. His contract was for two years, with the option of a third year. He made his Newcastle debut in a Premier League match at Bolton on 11 August and scored his first goal on 26 August against his former club Middlesbrough.

On 23 September, he scored a further two goals against West Ham United to bring his tally up to three for Newcastle. On 23 December, he again scored two goals against Derby County. After an injury lay off over the new year, Viduka was brought back into the side by new manager Kevin Keegan, where he played as part of a 4–3–3 formation along with Michael Owen and Obafemi Martins. This new formation brought about a change of fortune for Newcastle as the three strikers rescued them from a relegation battle, with Viduka scoring two more goals over the rest of the season and setting up others for Martins and Owen before picking up an Achilles' heel injury before the last game of the season.

Viduka made his return to the first team after six months out injured at former club Middlesbrough, coming on for Martins as a substitute on 29 November 2008. This was a great relief for manager Joe Kinnear, who stated that he had previously feared the Australian's career might have been prematurely ended by his injury woes. Later, Kinnear suggested to reporters that Viduka might call time on his career at the end of the 2008–09 season. Viduka, however, later expressed his desire to continue playing past this season after acquiring a groin injury in late December. After returning from injury, he was immediately used by newly appointed coach Alan Shearer in an attempt to prevent the team's relegation. After playing a man of the match performance in the 3–1 victory against his former team Middlesbrough, Mark appeared to have scored his first goal of the season against Fulham. Match referee Howard Webb, however, ruled that Kevin Nolan impeded goalkeeper Mark Schwarzer disallowing the goal. He was released following Newcastle's relegation.

International career
Viduka was available to be selected to Australia, Croatia and Ukraine due to his origins, and he began his international career with Australia in a friendly series against South Africa at the age of 18 in June 1994. The first game was played in Adelaide and the second game was played in Sydney. Australia won both games 1–0. He scored his first international goal in October 1997 in the 23rd minute of a friendly game against Tunisia.

In 1996, Viduka joined the Olyroos as they competed in the 1996 Summer Olympics. In Australia's first group game they lost to France 2–0. In their second group match they defeated Saudi Arabia 2–1. Viduka scored Australia's second goal in the 63rd minute with a clever back flick past the goalkeeper. In Australia's final group game Viduka made a contribution early in the game with an assist to Aurelio Vidmar in the 3rd minute. Despite Australia's early 0–2 lead, Spain made a spirited comeback and won 3–2. Due to the losses to France and Spain the Olyroos did not progress further in the tournament.

Viduka featured in the two World Cup qualifiers against Iran in 1997. Australia failed to qualify. Viduka was also a part of the Australia team that competed in the 1997 Confederations Cup. He scored Australia's opening goal in a 3–1 win over Mexico in Australia's first group game. However, in the final against Brazil he was sent off in the 24th minute after receiving a red card. Australia went on to lose the encounter 6–0.

In 1999, Viduka featured in a friendly against Brazil. The game was played at the Melbourne Cricket Ground and concluded with a 2–2 draw. Viduka assisted Paul Agostino with the first goal of the game. He also appeared in friendly matches against Hungary and Czech Republic in 2000. Defeating Hungary 3-0 and losing to Czech Republic 3–1. That same here Viduka once again joined the Olyroos in the 2000 Olympic Games in his home country of Australia. In 2001, he played alongside Australia as they competed against Uruguay in a two leg World Cup Qualifier. Australia lost on aggregate 3–1. This meant Viduka and Australia spent another World Cup on the sidelines.

In 2003, Viduka scored his third international goal in a friendly against Ireland. Australia would go on to lose the match 2–1.

Viduka began captaining Australia in September 2005 in place of the injured Craig Moore, the regular captain. His first game as captain was in a World Cup Qualifier against Solomon Islands in Sydney, in which Australia won 7–0. He scored 2 goals on the occasion including a spectacular bicycle-kick goal. Viduka would go on to score a third goal only to be denied a hat-trick after being ruled offside. It was his first time playing against a team from the Oceana region. In October 2005, he continued his captaincy when he led Australia to a 5-0 crushing of Jamaica at Craven Cottage in a friendly game. In the 47th minute of the game Archie Thompson crossed to Viduka, who controlled the ball, thought about appealing for handball but then had time to crash the ball into the net.

Viduka thrived under Guus Hiddink's tenure as coach of the national squad and led Australia as it qualified for the 2006 FIFA World Cup in Germany over a two-leg qualifier against Uruguay. In the second leg, during the first half a swift flick kick from Viduka found Harry Kewell inside the box. Kewell scuffed his shot but the ball bounced kindly to Mark Bresciano who went on to score the goal that forced the Qualifier to go to a penalty shoot out. Viduka would go on to miss his penalty, however Australia went on to win the shootout anyway.

It was the first time in 32 years that Australia qualified to participate in the World Cup. On 21 May 2006, he was named as the Australian captain for the World Cup.

In a lead up to the World Cup, Viduka captained Australia to friendly matches against the Netherlands and Greece. The Greece game was played at the Melbourne Cricket Ground. Australia won 1–0. Australia's game with the Netherlands ended with a 1–1 draw. After trailing 1-0 Australia earned a penalty in the second half. Viduka took the spot kick, only to hit the top bar. However Tim Cahill scored of the rebound. Viduka also led Australia's national team to their first World Cup finals victory with a 3–1 win over Japan in June 2006, as well as guiding them through an encounter with Brazil, losing 2–0, and a controversial bout with Croatia, ending with a 2–2 draw. He then led Australia into the second round, where they lost their round of 16 match to Italy. Although a regular scorer in the Premier League, Viduka has struggled to score any significant goals for the Socceroos, and the 2006 World Cup was no different.

Viduka considered retiring from international competition after the 2006 World Cup, citing increasing family commitments as the primary reason. In September 2006, however, he confirmed that he would continue playing for Australia and intended to compete in the 2007 Asian Cup. In a friendly against Singapore, a week before the start of the Asian Cup, Viduka scored two headed goals in a 3–0 victory for Australia; former Leeds teammate Harry Kewell scored the third. It was the second time he scored two goals in an international match, having previously done so against the Solomon Islands in 2005.

On Australia's first ever Asian Cup participation, Viduka captained the side and he scored their solitary goal against Iraq, a game which they ultimately lost 1–3. In the next match, he scored two goals against co-host team Thailand, defeating them 4–0; other goals scored by Michael Beauchamp and Harry Kewell and making them fall out of the remaining competition. At one stage, he led the goalscoring at the Asian Cup tournament, although his team was eliminated in the quarter-finals in a penalty shootout against Japan. Subsequent to that loss, question marks hang over whether Viduka will continue his international career. Two years on from the 2007 Asian Cup, he was still yet to return for the Socceroos, either stating he had injuries or club commitments. He missed World Cup Qualifiers against Qatar, Bahrain and Japan, even though fully fit and asked to play by then-Socceroos manager Pim Verbeek. Questions were raised over his commitment to the national team, even by other members of the squad. Despite calls from Adrian Alston, Graham Arnold and Viduka's then-agent Steve Kutner for Viduka to be selected for the 2010 FIFA World Cup, Viduka had already decided to retire, aged 34.

Personal life
Viduka and his wife Ivana have three sons together: Joseph (born November 2002), Lucas (born September 2006) and Oliver (born May 2008). His father Joe immigrated to Australia from Croatia in the 1960s, and Croatian footballer and Ballon d'Or winner Luka Modrić is his cousin.

Viduka currently lives in Zagreb, where he owns a coffee shop and enjoys making coffee.

Viduka had a song written about him by English singer/songwriter and Middlesbrough fan Alistair Griffin (who also previously co-wrote the football song recorded by Terry Venables). The song lyrics were written to the tune of Leonard Cohen's "Hallelujah". Middlesbrough manager Gareth Southgate embraced the tune as a way of raising money for his chosen charity, Macmillan Cancer Support. Leonard Cohen gave permission for the song to be released as a charity download single.

Viduka was a huge AC Milan fan as a kid as he grew up watching Marco van Basten, Frank Rijkaard and Ruud Gullit.

Viduka has been a member of Melbourne City FC since its inaugural season. He is affectionately referred to by his nicknames "V-Bomber" and "Big Dukes" in Australia.

Career statistics

Club

International
Source:

Honours
Melbourne Knights
National Soccer League: 1994–95
National Soccer League Cup: 1994–95
NSL Minor Premiership: 1993–94, 1994–95

Dinamo Zagreb
Prva HNL: 1995–96, 1996–97, 1997–98
Croatian Cup: 1995–96, 1996–97, 1997–98

Celtic
Scottish League Cup: 1999–2000

Australia U20
OFC U-20 Championship: 1994

Australia U23
OFC U-23 Championship: 1996
Individual
Oceania Footballer of the Year: 2000
Australian Sports Medal: 2000
SPFA Players' Player of the Year: 2000
NSL Top Goalscorer: 1993–94, 1994–95
NSL U21 Player of the Year: 1993–94, 1994–95
Johnny Warren Medal: 1993–94, 1994–95
SPL Top Goalscorer: 1999–00
 Australian Institute of Sport 'Best of the Best':<ref>Australian Institute of Sport 'Best of the Best'  </</ref> 2001.
Alex Tobin OAM Medal: 2011
FFA Hall of Fame: 2014
Sport Australia Hall of Fame inductee: 2021

References

External links

 OzFootball profile
 
 
 Statistics at footballdatabase.com
 

1975 births
Living people
1997 FIFA Confederations Cup players
2005 FIFA Confederations Cup players
2006 FIFA World Cup players
2007 AFC Asian Cup players
Australia youth international soccer players
Australia under-20 international soccer players
Australia international soccer players
Australian expatriate soccer players
Australian expatriate sportspeople in England
Australian expatriate sportspeople in Scotland
Soccer players from Melbourne
Australian people of Croatian descent
Australian people of Ukrainian descent
Celtic F.C. players
Croatian Football League players
Expatriate footballers in Croatia
Expatriate footballers in England
Expatriate footballers in Scotland
Association football forwards
Footballers at the 1996 Summer Olympics
Footballers at the 2000 Summer Olympics
Leeds United F.C. players
Melbourne Knights FC players
Middlesbrough F.C. players
National Soccer League (Australia) players
Newcastle United F.C. players
GNK Dinamo Zagreb players
Olympic soccer players of Australia
Premier League players
Scottish Premier League players
Australian Institute of Sport soccer players
Scottish league football top scorers
Melbourne City FC non-playing staff
Australian soccer players
Sport Australia Hall of Fame inductees